The Kugel-Erlass, also known as Aktion Kugel, was a secret decree (Geheimbefehl), issued by Nazi Germany on 2 March 1944. The decree stated that escaped Allied prisoners of war, especially officers and senior non-commissioned officers, should be handed over to the Sicherheitsdienst (SD) who should execute them, "im Rahmen der Aktion Kugel" ( Aktion Kugel), in Mauthausen-Gusen concentration camp.

This order was in direct contravention of the provisions of the Third Geneva Convention.

An exception was made for escaped British and American prisoners of war. Their fate was to be decided by the German High Command (Oberkommando der Wehrmacht) on a case-by-case basis. The bullet decree was later amended to include British soldiers after the "Great Escape" from Stalag Luft III of 25 March 1944.

The number of escaped prisoners of war executed by the Kugel-Erlass is not precisely known; estimates vary between 1,300 and 5,040 executed. The vast majority of these prisoners of war came from the USSR. Five escaped Dutch officers are known, and four more are suspected, to have been executed in Mauthausen as a result of the Kugel-Erlass.

See also
 Le Paradis massacre
 Severity Order
 Commissar Order
 Commando Order
 Adolf Hitler's directives
 German High Command orders for Treatment of Soviet Prisoners of War
 German commando operations
 Oflag
 Gleiwitz incident, 1939
 Operation Greif, 1944

References

External links
Ess.uwe.ac.uk
Icrc.org
The Avalon Project: Document No. 1650-PS
Leo de Hartog: officieren achter prikkeldraad 1940-1945. (Dutch officers behind barbed wire 1940-1945) 

 
Nazi war crimes